Darwinia salina is a small shrub in the myrtle family. It is native to South Australia.

References

salina
Endemic flora of Australia
Flora of South Australia
Myrtales of Australia
Plants described in 1991
Taxa named by Lyndley Craven